The Boccia Individual BC1 event at the 2008 Summer Paralympics was held in the Olympic Green Convention Center on 7–9 September.
The preliminary stages consisted of 4 round-robin groups of 5 competitors each. The top two players in each group qualified for the final stages.
The event was won by Joao Paulo Fernandes, representing .

Results
 indicates matches in which an extra (fifth) end was played

Preliminaries

Pool A

Pool B

Pool C

Pool D

Competition bracket

References

Boccia at the 2008 Summer Paralympics